Jaroslav Dvořák (born 18 July 1896, date of death unknown) was a Czech weightlifter. He competed in the men's light heavyweight event at the 1920 Summer Olympics.

References

External links
 

1896 births
Year of death missing
Czech male weightlifters
Olympic weightlifters of Czechoslovakia
Weightlifters at the 1920 Summer Olympics
Place of birth missing